Crowea is a genus of  small evergreen shrubs in the family Rutaceae, sometimes known as waxflowers. There are three species and many subspecies and cultivars, all of which are popular as ornamentals because of their abundant, attractive flowers which often occur during autumn and winter. Crowea species are all endemic to Australia, where they occur in Victoria, New South Wales and Western Australia.

Description
Croweas are evergreen shrubs to about 1.5 m tall. The leaves are simple, glabrous and, as with other members of the Rutaceae, have oil glands and are aromatic. The flowers occur singly in the axils of the leaves, are pink and star-shaped have five petals, five sepals and ten stamens in two rings around the ovary. Crowea are closely related, and the flowers similar in appearance to those of other member of the family Rutaceae, especially Philotheca, Eriostemon and Boronia.

Taxonomy and naming
The genus was described and named by James Edward Smith in 1798 and was named "to honour James Crowe esq., F.L.S. of Lakenham, near Norwich, who died Jan 16, 1807 aged 56. This gentleman was extremely well versed in the botany of Britain, more especially in the genus Salix, to which he paid particular attention, having collected and cultivated all the species he could possibly procure. The specific name of the original species, Crowea saligna alludes to Mr. Crowe's merits in this department".

The three species are accepted by the Australian Plant Census as at November 2020:
 Crowea angustifolia Sm. - Western Australia
 Crowea exalata F.Muell. - Queensland, New South Wales, Australian Capital Territory and Victoria
 Crowea saligna Andrews - New South Wales

Propagation and cultivation
Croweas are hardy in cultivation, moderately tolerant of frost, growing best in a well-drained mulch in partial shade. Propagation is easiest from cuttings.

In popular culture
Crowea is the title of a waltz composed 1919 by Western Australian musician Fred Barwick.

References

Zanthoxyloideae
Zanthoxyloideae genera
Endemic flora of Australia
Flora of Victoria (Australia)
Flora of New South Wales
Rosids of Western Australia